Henry "Harry" Pickett (26 March 1862 – 3 October 1907) was an English cricketer who represented Essex for 17 years although only the last four were at first-class level. A fast bowler he was 'powerfully built' and 'bowled with a high arm'. His most significant performance came in 1895 when he took all ten Leicestershire wickets for 32 runs. These are the best innings figures recorded by an Essex bowler, the fourth best in the County Championship, and the ninth best in first-class cricket.

Born in Stratford, Pickett first played for Essex in 1881 but it would be 13 years before the county was awarded first-class status. In the intervening period he did make several first-class appearances for the Marylebone Cricket Club (MCC), the first in 1884 against Sussex. He played in Essex's first ever first-class match in 1894 but struggled in that first season taking 11 wickets at an average of 31.09. The following season, Essex's first season in the County Championship, was more successful. He took 66 wickets, at 17.72, including the 10/32 against Leicestershire as well as five-fors in wins against Somerset and Hampshire. Over the next two seasons he took 50 wickets at around 30. He didn't play again for Essex following his benefit season in 1897, he played one match for the MCC in 1898 before two seasons of umpiring. Following the end of his playing career he also coached at Clifton College.

Pickett disappeared on 27 September 1907 and a week later was found washed ashore on Aberavon beach. His death is listed as suicide.

References

1862 births
1907 suicides
People from Stratford, London
English cricketers of 1864 to 1889
English cricketers of 1890 to 1918
English cricketers
Marylebone Cricket Club cricketers
Essex cricketers
Cricketers who have taken ten wickets in an innings
Wembley Park cricketers
Suicides by drowning in the United Kingdom
Suicides in Wales